Ren Hui (born 11 August 1983) is a Chinese speed skater who won a bronze medal in the Women's 500 m at the 2006 Winter Olympics and bronze at the World Single Distance Championships for Women.

Records

Competitions 
 Olympic Games
 2006 Winter Olympics – Women's 500 metres
 2006 Winter Olympics – Women's 1000 metres
 2010 Winter Olympics – Women's 1000 metres

 World Single Distance Speed Skating Championships
 2004 World Single Distance Speed Skating Championships – 500 m

 World Sprint Speed Skating Championships
 2010 World Sprint Speed Skating Championships

 ISU Speed Skating World Cup
 2006–07 ISU Speed Skating World Cup
 2007–08 ISU Speed Skating World Cup
 2008–09 ISU Speed Skating World Cup – Women's 100 metres
 2008–09 ISU Speed Skating World Cup – Women's 500 metres
 2008–09 ISU Speed Skating World Cup – Women's 1000 metres
 2009–10 ISU Speed Skating World Cup – Women's 500 metres
 2009–10 ISU Speed Skating World Cup – Women's 1000 metres

 Asian Winter Games
 2007 Asian Winter Games – 1000 m

See also 
 China at the 2006 Winter Olympics
 China at the 2010 Winter Olympics

References 

 http://www.skateresults.com/skaters/ren_hui

1983 births
Living people
Chinese female speed skaters
Speed skaters at the 2006 Winter Olympics
Speed skaters at the 2010 Winter Olympics
Olympic speed skaters of China
Olympic bronze medalists for China
Olympic medalists in speed skating
Sportspeople from Heilongjiang
Medalists at the 2006 Winter Olympics
Asian Games medalists in speed skating
Speed skaters at the 2007 Asian Winter Games
Medalists at the 2007 Asian Winter Games
Asian Games bronze medalists for China
20th-century Chinese women
21st-century Chinese women